Lanig is a surname. Notable people with the surname include:

 Evi Lanig (born 1933), German alpine skier
 Hans-Peter Lanig (1935–2022), German alpine skier
 Martin Lanig (born 1984), German football midfielder